Maguing, officially the Municipality of Maguing (Maranao: Inged a Maguing), is a 2nd class municipality in the province of Lanao del Sur, Philippines. According to the 2020 census, it has a population of 30,436 people.

History
In 2005, Barangays Lumbac-Dimarao and Pindolonan were created.

Geography

Barangays
Maguing is politically subdivided into 34 barangays.

Climate

Demographics

References

External links
 Maguing Profile at the DTI Cities and Municipalities Competitive Index
 [ Philippine Standard Geographic Code]
 Philippine Census Information

Municipalities of Lanao del Sur